The Bogg Springs Hotel is a historic hotel in rural Polk County, Arkansas. Built in 1904–07, it is the only surviving element of a summer resort that thrived in the area in the 1920s. It now forms one of the buildings in the Bogg Springs Christian Camp site, owned by the American Baptist Association. It is located at the western end of Arkansas Highway 84, west of Wickes. The building is a two-story wood-frame structure, ten bays wide, with vernacular styling. A single-story porch extends across the west-facing front, and a kitchen ell projects to the rear.

The hotel building was listed on the National Register of Historic Places in 1993.

See also
National Register of Historic Places listings in Polk County, Arkansas

References

External links
Bogg Springs Camp web site

Hotel buildings on the National Register of Historic Places in Arkansas
Buildings and structures in Polk County, Arkansas
National Register of Historic Places in Polk County, Arkansas
Hotel buildings completed in 1904